The 1959 Men's World Weightlifting Championships were held in Warsaw, Poland from September 29 to October 4, 1959. There were 85 men in action from 19 nations.

The Soviet Union earned the most gold medals (4) and the most overall medals (7). Host nation Poland finished second with one gold and five overall medals.

Four World Records were broken: in 82.5 kg category, Rudolf Plyukfelder of the Soviet Union set two new world records in the snatch (141 kg) and the total (457.5 kg), while Ireneusz Paliński of Poland set a new world record in the clean & jerk (178.5 kg). Plyukfelder's total would have also won the 90 kg category.

In the 90+ kg category, Yury Vlasov of the Soviet Union broke the world record in the snatch (153 kg).

Medal summary

Medal table

References

Results (Sport 123)
Weightlifting World Championships Seniors Statistics

External links
International Weightlifting Federation

World Weightlifting Championships
World Weightlifting Championships
World Weightlifting Championships
International weightlifting competitions hosted by Poland